Candle Media is a Blackstone-backed, Los Angeles-based media company co-founded by former Disney executives Kevin A. Mayer and Thomas O. Staggs that currently owns the companies Moonbug Entertainment, Hello Sunshine, and the production company of Israeli thriller series Fauda, Faraway Road Productions. It also owned a minority stake on Westbrook Inc.

History 
Before co-founding Candle Media in 2021, Kevin Mayer and Tom Staggs originally led a blank-check company Forest Road Acquisition Corp.

In August 2021, the company began acquiring content companies starting with Reese Witherspoon’s Hello Sunshine.

In November 2021, Candle Media acquired Moonbug Entertainment, a children’s entertainment company that has produced shows including CoComelon and Blippi, for nearly $3 billion.

In January 2022, the company announced a strategic minority investment in Will Smith and Jada Pinkett Smith’s Westbrook. In the same month, Candle Media also acquired Faraway Road Productions for an estimated $50 million.

In May 2022, Candle Media acquired ATTN:, a social media storytelling company, for $100 million. In the same month, the company also announced that it will acquire Exile Content Studio, a Spanish production studio. To date, Candle Media has spent approximately $4 billion on acquisition deals.

Subsidiaries

References 

The Blackstone Group companies
Mass media companies of the United States
Entertainment companies based in California
2021 establishments in California
Companies based in Los Angeles
Mass media companies established in 2021
American companies established in 2021